William Carlton Eacho III (born 1954) is the former United States Ambassador to Austria. Eacho was nominated by President Barack Obama in June 2009. He was confirmed by the US Senate and sworn in during August 2009. He succeeded David F. Girard-diCarlo  as ambassador in 2009 and was succeeded by Alexa Wesner in September 2013. Eacho presently is a co-founder of The Partnership For Responsible Growth, a bipartisan organization advocating for US legislation for a fee on carbon extraction to counter the climate change threat.

In 2014, Eacho became a visiting professor of the practice at the Sanford School of Public Policy at Duke University. From 2013 to 2018, Ambassador Eacho was also affiliated with the Center for Transatlantic Relations as a Distinguished Fellow, as well as visiting scholar at the Johns Hopkins University Paul H. Nitze School of Advanced International Studies, with an expertise in global energy, environment, and security issues. He formerly served on the Energy and Security Task Force of the International Peace Institute.

Personal life
Eacho graduated magna cum laude from Duke University with a degree in Law and the Economy, a self-designed major combining political science and economics. Prior to attending Harvard Business School, from which he graduated with Distinction in 1979, he was a Financial Analyst in the Corporate Finance department of Hornblower & Weeks, in New York City, and was an associate with Loeb, Rhoades, Hornblower & Company in Los Angeles.

Eacho was one of Obama's biggest campaign fundraisers, and he helped raise over $500,000. Eacho and his immediate family also donated $226,000 to federal politics in 2007-08, according to the OpenSecrets, a non-profit, nonpartisan research group based in Washington, D.C. that tracks the effects of money and lobbying on elections and public policy.

He and his wife, Donna, have three sons.

Professional
William Eacho was Chief Executive Officer (CEO) of Carlton Capital Group, LLC in Bethesda, Maryland until 2009. He had previously served as the Executive Vice President of Alliant Foodservice Inc. – then a $6 billion national foodservice distributor. He served on three boards – Stanley Martin Companies, Inc., Bialek Corporation, Inc. and the Boys & Girls Club of Greater Washington. Eacho also previously served on the Board of Visitors of Duke University's Trinity College of Arts and Sciences, on the Board of Trustees of Landon School, and is a member of World President's Organization and Chief Executives Organization. Following a long-standing tradition established by previous U.S. ambassadors, he was also an ex officio member on the board of directors of the Salzburg Global Seminar from 2009 to 2013 was elected to full board membership in 2013, and served until 2017, when he was named a Senior Fellow.

Eacho serves on the board of directors of the International Foundation for Electoral Systems (IFES), Friends of Acadia, and Pixspan, Inc.

On September 24, 2013, Austrian Federal President Heinz Fischer awarded Eacho the Grand Decoration of Honour for Services to the Republic of Austria in Gold with Sash, the first American ambassador to be so honored since Milton Wolf received it in 1980. The celebration was held at the residence of Martin Sajdik, Permanent Representative of Austria to the United Nations in New York.

References

1954 births
Living people
Duke University alumni
Harvard Business School alumni
People from Bethesda, Maryland
Ambassadors of the United States to Austria